The Bilsam Sky Cruiser is a Polish microlight aircraft designed and produced by Bilsam Aviation of Poznań, introduced in the early 2000s. The aircraft is supplied as a complete ready-to-fly-aircraft, as a kit and in the form of plans for amateur construction.

The manufacturer's website is non-functional and has been so since about 2008, so it is not clear if the company is still in business.

Design and development
With a Rotax 912 ULS engine it is an accepted US light sport aircraft  and also a Transport Canada accepted Advanced Ultra-Light Aeroplane.

Originally shown as a pusher configuration design in 2003, by 2004 the aircraft had been redesigned. In its production configuration the Sky Cruiser features a cantilever high-wing, a two-seats-in-side-by-side configuration enclosed cabin with doors for access, fixed tricycle landing gear with wheel pants and a single engine in tractor configuration.

The aircraft is made from composite material. The standard engine used is the  Suzuki automotive conversion powerplant.

The Sky Cruiser was redesigned by BOT Aircraft as the BOT SC07 Speed Cruiser.

Operational history
In June 2015 one example was registered in the United States with the Federal Aviation Administration and two in Canada registered with Transport Canada.

Specifications (Sky Cruiser)

References

External links

Photo of a Sky Cruiser

Sky Cruiser
2000s Polish sport aircraft
2000s Polish ultralight aircraft
2000s Polish civil utility aircraft
Single-engined tractor aircraft
High-wing aircraft
Homebuilt aircraft